Wilfred Joseph Ball (24 April 1895 – 23 July 1965) was an English cricketer.  Ball was a right-handed batsman who fielded as a wicket-keeper.  He was born at Thrapston, Northamptonshire.

Ball made his first-class debut for Northamptonshire in the 1924 County Championship against Nottinghamshire.  Seven years later he returned to county cricket, making three further first-class appearances for the county in the 1931 County Championship against Warwickshire, Derbyshire and Glamorgan.  In his four first-class matches, he just 10 runs at an average of 2.50, with a high score of 8.

He died at Hollowell, Northamptonshire on 23 July 1965.

References

External links
Wilfred Ball at ESPNcricinfo
Wilfred Ball at CricketArchive

1895 births
1965 deaths
People from Thrapston
English cricketers
Northamptonshire cricketers
Wicket-keepers